The 12539 / 40 Yesvantpur–Lucknow Express via Chennai is an Express superfast train belonging to Indian Railways South Western Railway zone that runs between  and  via Chennaiin India.

From October 2021, it was diverted to run via Perambur Chennai, instead of Renigunta.

Coaches
The 12539 / 40 Yesvantpur–Lucknow Express has one AC 2-tier, two AC 3-tier, 8 sleeper class, six general unreserved & two SLR (seating with luggage rake) coaches and two high capacity parcel van coaches. It does not carry a pantry car.

As is customary with most train services in India, coach composition may be amended at the discretion of Indian Railways depending on demand.

Service

As the average speed of the train is slightly above , as per railway rules, its fare includes a Superfast surcharge.

Rake sharing

16565/16566 – Yesvantpur–Mangalore Express

Schedule

Routing
The 12539 / 40 Yesvantpur–Lucknow Express runs from Yesvantpur Junction via ,  (Chennai), 
, 
 to Lucknow Charbagh.

Traction
As the route is fully electrified, an Erode based WAP-4 locomotive powers the train from end to end .

References

External links
 12539 Yesvantpur Lucknow Express at India Rail Info
 12540 Lucknow Yesvantpur Express at India Rail Info

Express trains in India
Transport in Bangalore
Rail transport in Karnataka
Rail transport in Tamil Nadu
Rail transport in Andhra Pradesh
Rail transport in Telangana
Rail transport in Maharashtra
Rail transport in Madhya Pradesh
Passenger trains originating from Lucknow